Ciocalypta is a genus of sea sponges belonging to the family Halichondriidae.

Species
, the World Register of Marine Species lists 27 species in the genus Ciocalypta:

References

Halichondrida